Joseph Rodan (born 15 February 1951) is a Fijian sprinter. He competed in the 400 metres at the 1984 Summer Olympics and the 1988 Summer Olympics. His son, Joseph Rodan Jr., represented Fiji in athletics at the 1998 and 2002 Commonwealth Games.

References

External links

1951 births
Living people
Athletes (track and field) at the 1984 Summer Olympics
Athletes (track and field) at the 1988 Summer Olympics
Fijian male sprinters
Fijian male hurdlers
Olympic athletes of Fiji
Commonwealth Games competitors for Fiji
Athletes (track and field) at the 1982 Commonwealth Games
Athletes (track and field) at the 1986 Commonwealth Games
Sportspeople from Suva